Algophilus lathridioides is a species of beetles in the family Haliplidae, the only species in the genus Algophilus. Its range includes parts of South Africa.

References

Haliplidae
Monotypic Adephaga genera